Thomas Joachim Cichon (born 9 July 1976) is a German former professional footballer who played as a centre-back.

Involvement in match-fixing
In June 2014 Cichon received a nine-month suspended sentence for accessory to fraud and tax fraud for his involvement in the 2009 European football match-fixing scandal. He admitted to having received €20,000 from the gambling mafia in exchange for not giving his full effort in VfL Osnabrück's 3–0 defeat to FC Augsburg on 17 April 2009.

References

External links
 
 

1976 births
Living people
People from Ruda Śląska
German footballers
Germany under-21 international footballers
German people of Polish descent
Polish emigrants to Germany
Naturalized citizens of Germany
Association football defenders
Bundesliga players
2. Bundesliga players
Super League Greece players
1. FC Köln players
1. FC Köln II players
Rot-Weiß Oberhausen players
Panionios F.C. players
VfL Osnabrück players
Moroka Swallows F.C. players
German expatriate footballers
German expatriate sportspeople in Greece
Expatriate footballers in Greece
German expatriate sportspeople in South Africa
Expatriate soccer players in South Africa